Ioanna Anagnostopoulou (born 12 June 1997) is a Greek rhythmic gymnast. She competed in the group rhythmic gymnastics competition at the 2016 Summer Olympics, where the team was eliminated in the qualification round.

References

Living people
1997 births
Greek rhythmic gymnasts
Gymnasts at the 2016 Summer Olympics
Olympic gymnasts of Greece